Chameera Dissanayake (born 10 December 1995) is a Sri Lankan cricketer. He made his Twenty20 debut for Burgher Recreation Club in the 2017–18 SLC Twenty20 Tournament on 1 March 2018. He made his List A debut for Burgher Recreation Club in the 2018–19 Premier Limited Overs Tournament on 4 March 2019.

References

External links
 

1995 births
Living people
Sri Lankan cricketers
Burgher Recreation Club cricketers
Kalutara Town Club cricketers
Place of birth missing (living people)